The Well Groomed Bride is a 1946 American romantic comedy film directed by Sidney Lanfield and starring Olivia de Havilland, Ray Milland, and Sonny Tufts. Written by Claude Binyon and Robert Russell, the film is about a man and a woman who fight over the last bottle of champagne left in San Francisco—he wants it to christen a new aircraft carrier, and she wants it as the centerpiece for her upcoming wedding reception. During the course of their fierce battle over the bottle, the two fall in love. This was de Havilland's first film after a two-year legal battle she waged against Warner Bros. regarding her rights under her contract.

Plot
In the spring of 1945 in San Francisco, United States Navy lieutenant Dudley Briggs (Ray Milland) is promised a two-week furlough and a promotion by his ship's captain if he can acquire a bottle of French champagne by the next morning to be used in launching of the U.S.S. Vengeance, the Navy's newest aircraft carrier. Dudley heads to a liquor store and finds the last magnum of French champagne in the city—champagne having become rare during the war. Unfortunately, he loses the bottle to a beautiful young woman named Margie Dawson (Olivia de Havilland), who is about to be married to Army lieutenant Torchy McNeil (Sonny Tufts), an Oregon football star, whom she has not seen in two years. Margie plans to present the bottle as the centerpiece for her upcoming wedding reception.
 
Dudley accompanies the couple to their hotel, where he tries to steal the magnum, but is unsuccessful in his efforts. Undaunted, he arranges a meeting between Torchy and his ex-girl friend, Rita Sloan (Constance Dowling). When Margie finds them together, she calls off the wedding and goes out with Dudley in order to get back at her former fiancée. Following Margie and Dudley onto the Richmond Ferry, Torchy confronts them, insisting that a marriage must have only "one quarterback". After giving him the magnum, Margie again breaks up with him. On the ferry, Dudley confesses to Margie that he is in love with her, but she suspects he only wants the champagne. Their date is interrupted by Dudley's commanding officer, captain Hornby, who has them arrested and arranges for Margie herself to christen the ship with the bottle of French champagne.

Meanwhile, Margie's father arrives for her wedding. After finding Torchy in Margie's robe, has him brought to the Provost Marshal on a charge of insanity. Hornby arrives and has Torchy released so he can convince him to give up the magnum of champagne. When Hornby mentions Dudley's girl friend in front of Margie, she is certain Dudley does not love her. Margie's father, however, believes Dudley loves Margie and suggests that she return the bottle of champagne to Dudley to see what he will do. At first, Torchy and Rita refuse to give up the bottle, but when they see the U.S.S. Vengeance about to be christened with a tiny bottle, their feelings of patriotism inspire a change of mind. Torchy, the former football star, makes a perfect pass with the bottle of champagne, and Margie christens the ship. Soon after, Margie receives a telegram from Dudley instructing her to meet him with the biggest bottle of champagne she can find—for their wedding.

Cast
 Olivia de Havilland as Margie Dawson 
 Ray Milland as Lt. Dudley Briggs 
 Sonny Tufts as Lt. Torchy McNeil 
 James Gleason as Capt. Hornby 
 Constance Dowling as Rita Sloane 
 Percy Kilbride as Mr. Dawson 
 Jean Heather as Wickley 
 Jay Norris as Mitch 
 John R. Reilly as Buck
 George Turner as Goose

Production
The Well Groomed Bride was filmed between February 2 and late March 1945. The New York preview was held on May 10, 1946. The film was released in the United States on May 17, 1945. This was de Havilland's first film after a two-year legal battle she waged against Warner Bros. regarding her rights under her contract. The working title of the film was Night Before. Paramount originally planned to make a picture under the title The Well Groomed Bride in 1942, hiring Manny Seff and George Beck to write the screen story, and Melvyn Frank and Norman Panama to write the screen adaptation. The work of these writers was not reflected in the 1945 screenplay.

References

External links
 
 
 

1946 films
1946 romantic comedy films
American romantic comedy films
American black-and-white films
Films scored by Roy Webb
Films directed by Sidney Lanfield
Paramount Pictures films
Films set in San Francisco
1940s English-language films
1940s American films